Vidyawati Chaturvedi (1926–2009) was an Indian politician from the state of the Madhya Pradesh. She represented Laundi Vidhan Sabha constituency of undivided Madhya Pradesh Legislative Assembly by winning General election of 1957. She also represented Khajuraho (Lok Sabha constituency) between 1980 and 1989. Her son Satyavrat Chaturvedi was also elected to Lok Sabha from Khajuraho later.

References 

2009 deaths
1926 births
People from Chhatarpur district
People from Hamirpur district, Uttar Pradesh
Indian National Congress politicians from Madhya Pradesh
Madhya Pradesh MLAs 1957–1962
India MPs 1984–1989
India MPs 1980–1984
Lok Sabha members from Madhya Pradesh
Rajya Sabha members from Madhya Pradesh
Women members of the Madhya Pradesh Legislative Assembly
20th-century Indian women politicians
20th-century Indian politicians
Women members of the Lok Sabha
Women members of the Rajya Sabha